The Climbers is a 1919 American silent comedy-drama film produced and distributed by the Vitagraph Company of America. It is based on Clyde Fitch's 1901 Broadway play. This film was directed by Tom Terriss and stars Corinne Griffith.

A previous version of Fitch's play had been made in 1915 as The Climbers with Gladys Hanson and a later version in 1927 again as The Climbers with Irene Rich.

A print is preserved in the Library of Congress.

Plot
In order to keep his social-climbing wife and daughters in the lifestyle they are accustomed to, wealthy George Hunter makes some large investments in the stock market, but the stocks crash and he loses a great deal of money. His wealthy aunt offers to bail the family out, but complications ensue.

Cast
Corinne Griffith as Blanche Sterlin
Hugh Huntley as Richard Sterling
Percy Marmont as Ned Warden
Henry Hallam as George Hunter
Josephine Whittell as Clara Hunter
Jane Jennings as Aunt Ruth 
James Spottswood as James Garfield Trotter
Corinne Barker as Julia Godesby
Emily Fitzroy as Mrs. Hunter
Charles Halton as Jordan
James A. Furey

References

External links

allmovie/synopsis; The Climbers
Lantern slide promotional

1919 films
American silent feature films
1910s English-language films
1919 comedy-drama films
American black-and-white films
Vitagraph Studios films
Films directed by Tom Terriss
1910s American films
Silent American comedy-drama films